Heat and Sunlight is a 1987 independent film written, directed by and starring Rob Nilsson.

Summary
It tells the story of a photojournalist (Nilsson), who had worked in Biafra, trying to patch up his relationship with his lover Carmen (Consuelo Faust) despite his jealousy and violent impulses.

Soundtrack
The music from the David Byrne/Brian Eno album My Life in the Bush of Ghosts was used for the black and white video shot film.

Accolades
The film won the Grand Jury Prize at the 1988 Sundance Film Festival.

References

External links
 
 BFI
 MUBI

1987 films
American independent films
Films directed by Rob Nilsson
Sundance Film Festival award winners
Films scored by Michael Small
1980s English-language films
1980s American films